The 2000 Challenge Bell was a tennis tournament played on indoor carpet courts at the Club Avantage Multi-Sports in Quebec City in Canada that was part of Tier III of the 2000 WTA Tour. It was the 8th edition of the Challenge Bell, and was held from October 30 through November 5, 2000. Chanda Rubin won the singles title.

Champions

Singles

 Chanda Rubin def.  Jennifer Capriati, 6–4, 6–2
It was Rubin's only title of the year and the 3rd of her career.

Doubles

 Nicole Pratt /  Meghann Shaughnessy def.  Els Callens /  Kimberly Po, 6–3, 6–4
It was Graham's 2nd title of the year and the 2nd of her career. It was Shaughnessy's only title of the year and the 1st of her career.

External links
Official website

Challenge Bell
Tournoi de Québec
Challenge Bell
2000s in Quebec City